Emma is a 1932 American pre-Code comedy-drama film released by Metro-Goldwyn-Mayer, starring Marie Dressler, written by Leonard Praskins from a story by Frances Marion, and directed by Clarence Brown. The supporting cast features Richard Cromwell, Jean Hersholt and Myrna Loy.

Plot
Inventor Frederick Smith's wife dies during the birth of their fourth baby, Ronnie, leaving the family in the care of their faithful housekeeper Emma. Twenty years later, after Smith's inventions have made the family rich, the affable Ronnie, who is Emma's favorite, arrives home from college, announcing that he wants to quit school and become a pilot. The other Smith children, Bill, Gypsy and Isabelle, have all grown into spoiled adults, but Emma lovingly indulges them all, making excuses for their bad behavior to their father and everyone else.

As Emma leaves for her first vacation in 32 years with the family, the absent-minded Frederick sadly takes her to the station. She gets cold feet and decides to stay home, but Frederick won't let her and decides to go along with her to Niagara Falls. Waiting for their train, Frederick proposes and Emma accepts, even though she is afraid that people will talk. When the children learn about the marriage, Ronnie is happy for them, but the other children are embarrassed by the blot on their social record. On their honeymoon, as the happy Frederick and Emma row on the lake, they are teased by some young vacationers, prompting Frederick to take the oars from Emma. The exertion causes a mild heart attack and they return home. As the contented Frederick listens to Emma sing to him, he dies, and a short time later, the family learns that he has left his entire estate to Emma.

Though Emma wants to give the money back to the children, all of them except Ronnie turn on her and threaten to prove that their father was crazy when he wrote the will. Emma throws them out and awaits the lawsuit they threaten while the loyal Ronnie goes to Canada for a flying assignment. Because the will cannot be broken, the children go to the district attorney to have him bring murder charges against Emma, using distorted testimony by Mathilda, the maid. When Ronnie hears about the trial, he desperately flies East to help Emma but is killed while flying through a dangerous storm.

Even though her life is in peril, she won't allow her kind attorney Haskins to defame the character or motives of the children. Her emotional plea for them in court results in her acquittal, but Emma's relief is ruined when she learns of Ronnie's death. A short time later, Emma gives all of the money to the children, telling Haskins that she hopes that now they will think better of her. After she sadly views Ronnie's body, Isabell, Bill and Gypsy beg her forgiveness and want her to stay with them, but she refuses, saying that her work with them is finished, but no matter what happens or where they all are, they will still belong to each other.

At a new position, Emma happily attends a doctor's large family and is pleased when the wife agrees to name her new baby Ronnie at Emma's request.

Cast
 Marie Dressler as Emma Thatcher Smith
 Richard Cromwell as Ronald 'Ronnie' Smith
 Jean Hersholt as Frederick 'Fred' Smith
 Myrna Loy as Countess Isabelle 'Izzy' Smith Marlin
 John Miljan as District Attorney
 Purnell Pratt as Haskins, the Lawyer
 Leila Bennett as Matilda, the Maid
 Barbara Kent as Gypsy Smith
 Kathryn Crawford as Sue Smith
 George Meeker as Bill Smith
 Anne Shirley as girl
 Dale Fuller as Maid at Hotel
 Wilfred Noy as Drake, the First Butler
 André Cheron as Count Pierre
 Wade Boteler as Airport Official (uncredited) 
 Edward LeSaint as Druggist (uncredited) 
 Dorothy Peterson as Mrs. Winthrop (uncredited)

Reception
The film was a big hit and made a profit of $898,000. Marie Dressler was also nominated as Best Actress at the 5th Academy Awards where Helen Hayes in The Sin of Madelon Claudet emerged victorious. Dressler had won the award the year before with Min and Bill.

Box office
The film grossed a total (domestic and foreign) of $1,972,000: $1,409,000 from the US and Canada and $563,000 elsewhere. It made a profit of $898,000.

References

External links
 
 
 
 

1932 films
1932 comedy-drama films
American comedy-drama films
American black-and-white films
Films directed by Clarence Brown
Metro-Goldwyn-Mayer films
Films produced by Harry Rapf
1930s English-language films
1930s American films